The Honda XR250R and XR250L are trail and dual-sport motorcycles made by Honda from 1979 through 2004, as part of the Honda XR series. They have four-stroke, SOHC four-valve  single-cylinder engines.

In 1981, the XR250 was updated with a single rear shock.  In 1984, the bike was introduced with Honda's Radial Four Valve Combustion Chamber (RFVC). It has a  claimed dry weight, and a 36-inch seat height (96–04). Honda said the engine produces 19.6 peak hp and 14-15 lb feet of torque. The 1996–2004 versions of the XR250R had 10.6 inches of suspension travel front and rear and 41mm front cartridge forks. The tire size was 80/100-21 front and 100/100-18 rear. It had 13–48 tooth gearing and a stock top speed of around 66 mph at 8000 rpm. The XR250L was a heavier, street-legal version which was introduced in 1991 and should not be confused with the older XL250R. Starting in 1981, the XR250 had a 21-inch front wheel. 1979 and 1980 versions had a 23 inch front wheel (3.00 x 23 tire size).

Unlike the CRF230F, which effectively replaced the XR200R in Honda's lineup as an air-cooled off-road motorcycle, the XR250R has no air cooled successor until potentially the CRF250F in 2019. That said the ‘F’ shares little more with the XR than it being a great starter play bike, 4 valve head, and an air cooled low maintenance bike. They are a different thing all together with the ‘F’ fuel injected, limited to 9.8” of travel, lower seat height by 2”, electric start, and a 5-speed transmission. The ‘F’ in stock form is a very good modern engine. The ‘R’ power plant feels dated and is lower performing in comparison.

The engines in both the XR250R and XR250L are identical. In the United States the L has a 3 mm smaller header pipe and a different carburetor to satisfy emissions regulations, though both carburetors have a 30 mm bore. The engine has a four-valve head with splayed rocker arms to actuate the valves.  Unusual for a single-cylinder engine, it has a two-into-one header pipe.  Throughout its production, the R version is kickstart only, has a six-speed transmission with chain final drive, and has stator ignition. For the pre-1996 models, the suspension travel was  front and rear. The XR250R is the enduro (competition) model; however, the L version is electric start, (except for the USA market XR250L, which never had electric start and which was discontinued after the 1996 model year), with pillion pegs, softer suspension and lower seat height. The changes between 1996 and 2004 consisted of decal updates, the mechanical parts being identical. The XR250R was discontinued after 2004. In Australia a XR250Y was released with upside-down forks and electric start in 05-06.

The 1991 Honda XR250L is the most demand of the entire XR series with more than 814,00 units being sold.

References

External links

XR250
Off-road motorcycles
Dual-sport motorcycles
Motorcycles introduced in 1979
Single-cylinder motorcycles